The 2005 Belarusian Premier League was the 15th season of top-tier football in Belarus. It started on April 16 and ended on November 5, 2005. Dinamo Minsk were the defending champions.

Team changes from 2004 season
Two lowest placed teams in 2004 (Lokomotiv Vitebsk and Belshina Bobruisk) relegated to First League. Lokomotiv Minsk won the 2004 First League and were promoted. Vedrich-97 Rechytsa finished 2nd in First League and were supposed to be promoted as well. However, due to weak club infrastructure they couldn't obtain licence to compete in Premiere League and decided to stay in First League. Torpedo-SKA Minsk, who finished 6th in 2004, lost financial support from their sponsor in early 2005 and, after losing almost all their main squad and not having funds to pay entrance fee for next season's Premiere League, had to relegate to Second League. BFF decided not to replace two withdrawn teams with anyone and the league was reduced to 14 clubs. Zvezda-VA-BGU Minsk changed their name to Zvezda-BGU Minsk.

Overview
Shakhtyor Soligorsk won their 1st champions title and qualified for the next season's Champions League. The championship runners-up Dinamo Minsk and 2005–06 Cup winners BATE Borisov qualified for UEFA Cup. Zvezda-BGU Minsk and Slavia, who finished on last two places, relegated to the First League.

Teams and venues

Table

Results

Belarusian clubs in European Cups

Top scorers

See also
2005 Belarusian First League
2004–05 Belarusian Cup
2005–06 Belarusian Cup

References

External links
RSSSF

Belarusian Premier League seasons
1
Belarus
Belarus